The 1968 Asia Golf Circuit was the seventh season of golf tournaments that comprised the Asia Golf Circuit, formerly known as the Far East Circuit. It was the first season under the new name, which was changed in anticipation of South Korea and India joining the circuit.

Hsieh Yung-yo of Taiwan was the overall circuit champion for the third time, having also claimed the title in 1964 and 1965. He was one of two players to win twice on the circuit, the other being Australian Randall Vines.

Schedule
The table below shows the 1968 Asia Golf Circuit schedule. There were no changes from the previous season.

Final standings
The Asia Golf Circuit standings were based on a points system.

References

Asia Golf Circuit
Asia Golf Circuit